Copelatus masculinus is a species of diving beetle. It is part of the genus Copelatus, which is in the subfamily Copelatinae of the family Dytiscidae. It was described by Régimbart in 1899.

References

masculinus
Beetles described in 1899